Almamy may also refer to:

 Almami, Title of West African Muslim rulers
 Almamy Ahmadou of Timbo, Fouta Djallon ruler
 Almamy Suluku, Sierra Leone ruler
 Almamy Sylla, Malian independence leader
 Almamy Schuman Bah, Guinean football player
 Almami Samori Moreira da Silva, Portuguese football player
 Almamy Doumbia, Ivorian football player
 Almamy Inc., financial news founded by Birane Hane